Air Strike also known as The Bombing or Unbreakable Spirit is a Chinese action war-drama film directed by Xiao Feng about the Japanese bombings of Chongqing during World War II. Mel Gibson joined as production designer. The film stars Liu Ye, Bruce Willis, Song Seung-heon and William Chan, with special appearances by Nicholas Tse, Tenma Shibuya, Adrien Brody, Simon Yam, Fan Bingbing and many others.

Premise 
With the beginning of World War II at the Battle of Shanghai and Nanjing in 1937, the story develops around the Chinese Air Force's great resistance against the Japanese invasion and occupation of China; the overwhelming might of the Imperial Japanese war machine taking down Shanghai and the capital of Nanjing, followed by heavy resistance and eventual fall of the interim wartime capital of Wuhan in 1938, and climaxing into the bloody six years-long all-airwar Battle of Chongqing, the wartime capital of China for the remainder of World War II, with the remnants of the Chinese Air Force, the refugees, and the people of Chongqing exemplifying the undying resilience against years of barbaric air strikes by the Imperial Japanese air power.

Cast

Main cast
 Liu Ye as Xue Gang Tou
 Bruce Willis as Col. Jack Johnson
 Song Seung-heon as An Ming Xun / An Ming He
 William Chan as Cheng Ting
 Fan Wei as Uncle Cui
 Wu Gang as Zhao Chun
 Ma Su as Ding Lian
 Che Yongli as Yaogu
 Feng Yuanzheng as Xue Man Guan
 Janine Chang as Qian Xue
 Geng Le as Jin Xiang

Special appearances
 Tenma Shibuya as Sato
 Zhang Fan as Cui Liu
 Nicholas Tse as Lei Tao
 Fan Bingbing as Ye Pei Xuan
 Anthony Rogers as Ye Pei Xuan's boyfriend
 Chen Daoming as Chief of City Defense
 Simon Yam as Air Defense Commander
 Adrien Brody as Steve
 Ray Lui as Air Force Colonel
 Lei Jia as Wan Jia
 Hu Bing as Hospital Dean
 Huang Haibing as Adjutant to Jack
 Rumer Willis as Julia
 Liu Xiaoqing as Madam Zhang
 Eva Huang as Du Mei
 Kenny Bee as Governmental Officer
 Jiro Wang as Young Officer
 Cao Kefang as Patriot
 Niki Chow as Junior Patriot

Production 
Mel Gibson served as the art director of the $65 million budgeted film. Principal photography on the film began in May 2015 in Shanghai, China. Filming was completed in November 2015.

Release
The film was filmed as a memorial for the 70th anniversary of the Allied victory in WWII. Originally scheduled to be released on 17 August 2018, it was later rescheduled to be released on 26 October 2018 in order to have a same-day global release.

In October 2018, it was announced that screening plans of the film had been cancelled in China. Earlier, it was leaked by TV anchor Cui Yongyuan that Fan Bingbing, one of the film's guest actors, was involved in a tax evasion scandal when starring in this film. However the home video release in the United States went on as scheduled.

The all-English dubbed version has been released to US streaming services and on Blu-ray.

See also
 Air Warfare of WWII from the Sino-Japanese War perspective
 Flying Tigers, the First American Volunteer Group (1AVG)

References

External links 
 
 
 Official trailer: 

2018 films
2018 independent films
2010s Mandarin-language films
Chinese 3D films
Chinese epic films
Chinese war drama films
World War II aviation films
World War II films based on actual events
Films shot in Shanghai
Films set in Chongqing
Films set in 1943
2018 3D films
2010s war films
2018 action drama films
China Film Group Corporation films
Lionsgate films
Second Sino-Japanese War films
2010s English-language films
2018 multilingual films
Chinese multilingual films